Joseph P. Beninati (born February 23, 1964) was an American real estate developer and private equity investor, a managing member of Bauhouse Group, a now defunct New York City real estate development and investment firm. He previously lived in Greenwich, Connecticut.

Early life and education
Beninati was born into an Italian-American family in the Bronx, New York. His father worked at the Saturday Evening Post before opening his own photo processing lab. Beninati was a foot messenger in Manhattan while a teenager for his father’s photography business. He graduated from Choate Rosemary Hall and earned his B.A. in political science at Middlebury College in Vermont in 1987.

Early career
After graduation, Beninati began his career on Wall Street as an investment banker for Dean Witter Reynolds. In 1990, he started  an investment banking boutique, Beninati & Wood, Inc. His firm advised a New York financier on the restructuring of C3, Inc. and the acquisition of Telos Corporation (both defense industry contractors). 
Beninati began as an investment banker to C3 until February 1992, when he became an employee upon the merger of C3 and  Telos. He became chief financial officer in May 1992, and  chairman from 1994–1995.

Later business career
In 1996, Beninati resigned from Telos and, along with longtime friend and fellow Choate alumnus, Jim Cabrera, founded Antares Investment Partners. A substantial part of the early business was devoted to private equity.  In 1997, Antares made a founding investment in a network engineering company called Greenwich Technology Partners. Beninati acted as the CEO of Greenwich Technology Partners until he was forced out by the board after questions relating to extravagant squandering of company funds.

Beninati and Antares began focusing on real estate development in 2002. By 2006, the firm’s real estate portfolio value was $4.5 billion.

Beninati is also the founder and Chairman of Bauhouse Group, a New York City real estate development and investment firm founded in 2012. Bauhouse is named after the Bauhaus style, an architectural movement in Europe prior to World War II. 
Bauhouse Group declared bankruptcy in 2016 with Beninati attempting to prevent Gamma Real Estate foreclosing on the $147.25 million loan and seizing property he had purchased.

Beninati bought three six-story buildings on East 58th Street off of Sutton Place in New York City for $32 million, as well as multiple pieces of air rights from neighbors, together with 22 tenant leases over a two-year period. He plans to demolish the buildings and build a 113-unit, 67-story, 950-foot luxury apartment building in their place in the Sutton Place neighborhood designed by Sir Norman Foster.  He borrowed $147.25 million from lender Gamma Real Estate, whose founder is Richard Kalikow. The goal was a tower combining height and luxury with the prestige of Sutton Place. Crain’s New York Business said the risky project was Beninati’s attempt to join the ranks of New York City’s most well-known builders such as Gary Barnett and Harry Macklowe.

Crain’s reports he rejected offers from several builders to partner on the project, preferring to keep it all under Bauhouse Group, his company founded in 2013.  The company is also building a 13-unit condo along the High Line.
 
The Gamma Real Estate matured in January 2016 and BH Sutton Mezz LLC was forced to declare bankruptcy in February 2016.  As of March 2016, Beninati is fighting Gamma Real Estate’s takeover attempt as Cushman and Wakefield appraised the property on February 25, 2016, at $256 mm, which is approximately $109 mm higher than the $147 mm of debt.

Beninati filed for bankruptcy in 2020 with $900 in his bank account.

Philanthropy
Beninati donates to Choate Rosemary Hall and the Beninati Family Scholarship is awarded each year.    In 2009, he founded the All American Athletic Foundation, a sponsor organization for student athletes.

Honors and awards
Beninati was given an Entrepreneur Award by the Harvard Business School Club, New York Chapter and was named an Entrepreneur of the Year by Ernst & Young during his time at Greenwich Technology Partners. Inc. Magazine named Beninati and Antares in their 30 Under 30.

Personal life
Joe Beninati met his wife at Choate and they married in 1990. They reside in Greenwich, Connecticut, with their three sons.

References

American real estate businesspeople
Living people
1964 births
Choate Rosemary Hall alumni
Middlebury College alumni
American investment bankers
20th-century American businesspeople
21st-century American businesspeople
Businesspeople from New York City
Businesspeople from Greenwich, Connecticut